Courtney Atherly (8 February 1948 – 20 November 2000) was a Guyanese boxer. He competed in the men's lightweight event at the 1972 Summer Olympics. At the 1972 Summer Olympics, he lost to Antonio Gin of Mexico.

References

1948 births
2000 deaths
Bantamweight boxers
Lightweight boxers
Guyanese male boxers
Olympic boxers of Guyana
Boxers at the 1972 Summer Olympics
Boxers at the 1970 British Commonwealth Games
Commonwealth Games bronze medallists for Guyana
Commonwealth Games medallists in boxing
Boxers at the 1971 Pan American Games
Pan American Games competitors for Guyana
Sportspeople from Georgetown, Guyana
Medallists at the 1970 British Commonwealth Games